Papa Diene Faye (born 30 November 1996) is a Senegalese footballer who plays as a winger for São Bento, on loan from Ponte Preta.

Career

Faye started his career with Mbour Petite-Côte in Senegal, before joining Moroccan side AS Salé. After leaving AS Salé due to delayed payments, he trained at the Moroccan academy Ginga Foot Casablanca, which was coached by a Brazilian, who eventually helped him join Associação Atlética Ponte Preta in the Brazilian second division.

References

External links
 Papa Faye at Soccerway

Senegalese footballers
1996 births
Association football forwards
Living people
Senegalese expatriate footballers
Senegalese expatriate sportspeople in Brazil
Expatriate footballers in Brazil